Seven sins may refer to:
 The seven deadly sins, a classification of vices used in early Christian teachings
 Seven Sins of Medicine, a perspective of medical ethics
 The Seven Sins of Memory, a 2001 book by psychologist Daniel Schacter
 7 Sins (video game), a video game
 Seven Sins, a soap opera starring Marcelo Novaes
 The Seven Deadly Sins (manga), a Japanese fantasy manga series written and illustrated by Nakaba Suzuki

See also
 Haft-sin, a arrangement of seven symbolic items names start with the Persian letter "س" pronounced as "seen"
 Seven deadly sins (disambiguation)